The 32nd Guam Legislature was a meeting of the Guam Legislature. It convened in Hagatna, Guam on January 7, 2013 and ended on January 5, 2015, during the 3rd and 4th years of Eddie Calvo's 1st Gubernatorial Term.

In the 2012 Guamanian legislative election, the Democratic Party of Guam won a majority of seats in the Guam Legislature.

Party Summary

Leadership

Legislative
 Speaker: Judith T.P. Won Pat
 Vice Speaker: Benjamin J.F. Cruz
 Legislative Secretary: Tina Muna Barnes

Majority (Democratic)
 Majority Leader: Rory J. Respicio
 Assistant Majority Leader: Thomas C. Ada
 Majority Whip: Dennis G. Rodriguez Jr.

Minority (Republican)
 Minority Leader: V. Anthony "Tony" Ada
 Assistant Minority Leader: Christopher M. Duenas
 Minority Whip: Thomas A. Morrison
 Assistant Minority Whip: Brant McCreadie

Membership

Committees

References 

Legislature of Guam
Politics of Guam
Political organizations based in Guam